There are about 196 colleges affiliated to Sambalpur University excluding four other colleges Nababharat Shiksha Parishad, SLB Medical College,  Sardar Raza’s Medical College and Sarala Nursing College with totalling more than 200 colleges.

Colleges that are affiliated to Sambalpur University are from the district of Sundargarh, Deogarh, Jharsuguda, Sambalpur, Bargarh, Boudh, Angul (some part) include:-

References

Sambalpur
Sambalpur